Selo Tsentralnoy usadby plemzavoda imeni Maxima Gorkogo (Maksim Gorkiy isemendäge toqomsoloq zavodınıñ Üźäk usadbahı) is a rural locality (a selo) and the administrative centre of Maxim-Gorkovsky Selsoviet, Belebeyevsky District, Bashkortostan, Russia. The population was 993 as of 2010. There are 16 streets.

Geography 
It is located 21 km southeast of Belebey (the district's administrative centre) by road. Russkaya Shveytsariya is the nearest rural locality.

References 

Rural localities in Belebeyevsky District